Tung Yüan is a crater on Mercury, within the Borealis Planitia. Its name was adopted by the International Astronomical Union in 1979, for the 10th century Chinese painter Tung Yüan.

References

Impact craters on Mercury